Cesare Cibo or Cesare Cybo (1495–1532) was a Roman Catholic prelate who served as Archbishop of Turin (1548–1562).

Biography
Cesare Cibo was born in 1495 in Genoa, Italy.
On 22 June 1548, he was appointed during the papacy of Pope Paul III as Archbishop of Turin.
He served as Archbishop of Turin until his death on 26 December 1562.

Episcopal succession
While bishop, he was the principal co-consecrator of:

References

External links and additional sources
 (for Chronology of Bishops) 
 (for Chronology of Bishops) 

16th-century Italian Roman Catholic archbishops
Bishops appointed by Pope Paul III
1495 births
1562 deaths
Clergy from Genoa